The siege of Barcelona of 1697 was successfully conducted during the Nine Years' War by France. Louis Joseph, Duke of Vendôme, commanding some 32,000 troops (reinforced with troops from the ended Italian front of the war), forced the garrison, under Prince George of Hesse-Darmstadt, to capitulate on 10 August. Nevertheless, it had been a hard fought contest: according to John Lynn, French casualties totalled around 9,000, while the losses on the Spanish side were 12,000 killed, wounded, or lost, although Antonio Espino López has set the figure for Spanish losses at 4,500 killed and 800 wounded, and the French casualties at 15,000, including 52 engineers.

Notes

References
Childs, John. The Nine Years' War and the British Army. Manchester University Press, 1991. 
Espino López, Antonio.  El frente catalán en la Guerra de los Nueve Años, 1689-1697 . Universitat Autònoma de Barcelona. Departament d'Història Moderna i Contemporània, 1994. 
Lynn, John A. The Wars of Louis XIV: 1667–1714. Longman, 1999. 

Conflicts in 1697
1697 in Spain
Military history of Barcelona
17th century in Barcelona
France–Spain military relations